Sinn Féin is the second largest political party in the Oireachtas and largest in Dáil Éireann. The Sinn Féin leader appoints a team of TDs and Senators to speak for the party on different issues. Their areas of responsibility broadly correspond to those of Government ministers.

Sinn Féin Front Bench
Following Micheál Martin's appointment as Taoiseach on 27 June 2020, Mary Lou McDonald became the second President of Sinn Féin and first woman to hold the  role of Leader of the Opposition.

On 2 July 2020, Mary Lou McDonald announced the new frontbench team, including the roles of Pádraig Mac Lochlainn and Aengus Ó Snodaigh who will be in attendance at front bench meetings.

Front Bench spokespersons

Chief Whip

Junior spokespersons

On 7 July 2020, Sinn Féin announced the appointments of the new junior spokespeople as well as the Deputy Whip and Councillor Liaison.

References

Bench
Front benches in the Oireachtas